Conor McGlynn (born November 20, 1998) is an American professional soccer player who plays as a midfielder for USL Championship club Hartford Athletic.

Career

Youth, college and amateur 
McGlynn played one season with the New York-based BW Gottschee Academy in 2015–16.

McGlynn spent all four years of his college soccer career at Siena College between 2016 and 2019, where he made 75 appearances, scored 7 goals and tallied 16 assists.

While at college, McGlynn also played soccer with USL League Two side FA Euro New York for three seasons over 2017, 2018 and 2019.

Professional

On March 12, 2020, McGlynn joined USL Championship side Hartford Athletic ahead of their 2020 season. He made his professional debut on July 17, 2020, starting against New York Red Bulls II. He scored his first professional goal on October 5 against New York Red Bulls II and his goal was No. 5 on ESPNs SportsCenter highlights.  On December 9, 2020 Hartford announced that McGlynn would return for the 2021 season.  McGlynn was again featured on SportCenter when on June 5th he launched a ball over the New York Red Bull II goalkeepers head from deep inside his own half to put Hartford up 5–0 in the 59th minute.

Personal
Conor's  younger brother is Jack McGlynn, who also plays professional soccer for Philadelphia Union in MLS.

The two faced off twice during the 2020 season. In their first game against each other on July 25, Hartford won 3–2. In their second meeting Jack scored a tying goal at the 76th minute to allow Philadelphia Union II to draw after an 88th minute goal from Conor was waived off due to a yellow card on Hartford defender Sam Strong.

References

External links
 
 
 Siena College bio

1997 births
American soccer players
Association football midfielders
F.A. Euro players
Hartford Athletic players
Living people
Siena Saints men's soccer players
Soccer players from New York (state)
USL Championship players
USL League Two players